A vesicointestinal fistula (or intestinovesical fistula) is a form of fistula between the bladder and the bowel.

Types
A fistula involving the bladder can have one of many specific names, describing the specific location of its outlet:
 Bladder and intestine: "vesicoenteric", "enterovesical", or "vesicointestinal"
 Bladder and colon: "vesicocolic" or "colovesical"
 Bladder and rectum: "vesicorectal" or "rectovesical"

Symptoms and signs
If fecal matter passes through the fistula into the bladder, the existence of the fistula may be revealed by pneumaturia, fecaluria, or recurrent urinary tract infection. Migration of urine through the fistula into the bowel may cause rectal passage of urine.

Causes
Many causes exist including:
 diverticulitis : most common ~ 60%
 colorectal cancer (CRC) : ~ 20%
 Crohn's disease : ~ 10%
 radiotherapy
 appendicitis
 trauma

Diagnosis
Various modalities of diagnosis are available:
 Cystoscopy
 Colonoscopy
 Poppy seed test
 Transabdominal ultrasonography
 Abdominopelvic CT
 MRI
 Barium enema
 Bourne test
 Cystogram

A definite algorithm of tests is followed for making the diagnosis.

See also
 Gouverneur’s syndrome

References

External links 

Urinary bladder disorders
Fistulas